Platanthera peramoena, the purple fringeless orchid, is a species of flowering plant in the orchid family. It is native to the Eastern United States, where it is found from the Mid-Atlantic states, the Ohio Valley and the Ozark Mountains. Its natural habitat is moist forests, marshes, and on streambanks.

It produces purple flowers in the summer. The moth Hemaris thysbe is considered its main pollinator.

References

External links 

peramoena
Orchids of the United States
Plants described in 1848